Terry Houston Fontenot (born December 16, 1980) is an American football executive who is the general manager of the Atlanta Falcons of the National Football League (NFL). Fontenot previously served with the New Orleans Saints in various executive roles throughout the 2000s and 2010s. He previously played college football at Tulane.

Early years and playing career
Terry was one of seven children born to Roy and Jacquetta Fontenot in Lake Charles, Louisiana. He went to LaGrange High School, where he graduated in 1999 after lettering in football, track and baseball.

College
Fontenot played four years at strong safety for Tulane from 1999 to 2002, serving as a captain in 2001. He graduated with a bachelor's degree in business and organizational information technology.

Executive career

New Orleans Saints
In 2003, Fontenot was hired by the New Orleans Saints as a scout. In 2013, Fontenot was promoted to director of pro scouting. In 2020, Fontenot was once again promoted to assistant general manager and vice president of pro personnel.

Atlanta Falcons
On January 19, 2021, Fontenot was named the general manager of the Atlanta Falcons. Fontenot is the first black general manager in Falcons history.

References

External links
Atlanta Falcons bio

1980 births
Living people
Sportspeople from Lake Charles, Louisiana
Tulane Green Wave football players
New Orleans Saints scouts
New Orleans Saints executives
Atlanta Falcons executives
Players of American football from Louisiana
American football safeties
National Football League general managers
African-American players of American football
20th-century African-American people